Alvin Bernard "Buck" Jones (August 17, 1917 – August 23, 2007) was a Canadian professional ice hockey player who played 50 games in the National Hockey League for the Toronto Maple Leafs and Detroit Red Wings between 1939 and 1943. The rest of his career, which lasted from 1937 to 1955, was spent in various minor leagues. He was born in Owen Sound, Ontario.

Career statistics

Regular season and playoffs

References

External links
 

1917 births
2007 deaths
Canadian expatriate ice hockey players in the United States
Canadian ice hockey defencemen
Detroit Red Wings players
Harringay Greyhounds players
Hershey Bears players
Ice hockey people from Ontario
Indianapolis Capitals players
Ontario Hockey Association Senior A League (1890–1979) players
Pittsburgh Hornets players
Providence Reds players
Seattle Bombers players
Sportspeople from Owen Sound
Tacoma Rockets (WHL) players
Toronto Maple Leafs players
Tulsa Oilers (USHL) players
Valleyfield Braves players
Western International Hockey League players